Walter L. Merten (December 11, 1922 – November 8, 2001) was an American politician.

Born in Milwaukee, Wisconsin, Merten went to Marquette University High School. He then received his bachelor's degree from Marquette University and his law degree from Marquette Law School. Merten served in the United States Army in the Philippines and Japan during World War II. Merten then served as a civilian military officer in Japan as a specialist in education and government. Merten served in the Wisconsin State Assembly in 1949 and 1951 as a Republican and then served in the Wisconsin State Senate in 1955. He died in Milwaukee, Wisconsin.

Notes

1922 births
2001 deaths
Politicians from Milwaukee
Marquette University alumni
Marquette University Law School alumni
Wisconsin lawyers
Republican Party members of the Wisconsin State Assembly
Republican Party Wisconsin state senators
20th-century American politicians
20th-century American lawyers
United States Army personnel of World War II
American expatriates in the Philippines
American expatriates in Japan